Claudio Donelli (24 April 1928 – 25 December 2022) was an Italian politician. A member of the Italian Communist Party, he served in the Chamber of Deputies from 1972 to 1976 and the Senate of the Republic from 1976 to 1979.

Donelli died in Varese on 25 December 2022, at the age of 94.

References

1928 births
2022 deaths
Italian Communist Party politicians
Deputies of Legislature VI of Italy
Senators of Legislature VII of Italy
People from the Province of Milan